John Edward "Jack" Fagan (21 June 1933 – 30 November 2015) was a New Zealand rugby league player who represented New Zealand.

Playing career
Fagan played for Ponsonby and represented Auckland. He was part of the Auckland side that defeated France in 1960.

A goal-kicking fullback, he was first selected for New Zealand in 1961, and went on to play 53 games for the Kiwis, including in 17 tests, until 1965. On retirement, he was New Zealand's second highest test scorer after Des White.

He retired in 1966, after breaking his arm.

Later years
Fagan coached the Mount Albert Lions and, in 1968, the University of Auckland's rugby league team.

He also served on the New Zealand Rugby League (NZRL) judiciary, the New Zealand Kiwis Association and the NZRL Museum board.

Fagan was made a life member of the NZRL at the 2015 annual meeting. He died in Takapuna on 30 November 2015.

References

1933 births
2015 deaths
New Zealand rugby league players
New Zealand national rugby league team players
Auckland rugby league team players
Ponsonby Ponies players
New Zealand rugby league coaches
Mount Albert Lions coaches
Rugby league fullbacks